Akbar Oluwakemi-Idowu Gbaja-Biamila (born May 6, 1979) is a former professional American football player in the National Football League (NFL) who is a commentator and co-host on the American Ninja Warrior television series. He is a former analyst for the NFL Network, and is currently one of the co-hosts of The Talk on CBS.

Gbaja-Biamila grew up in the Crenshaw district of Los Angeles with his mother and father, both of whom were born and raised in Nigeria, and his six siblings. Among his siblings is former Green Bay Packers defensive end Kabeer Gbaja-Biamila.

Before starting his professional career, Gbaja-Biamila played college football at San Diego State University. He was signed by the Oakland Raiders as an undrafted free agent in 2003. Gbaja-Biamila played for two other teams, the San Diego Chargers and Miami Dolphins.

Gbaja-Biamila currently co-hosts The Talk on CBS and American Ninja Warrior on NBC, as well as the Universal Kids spin off show, American Ninja Warrior Junior.

Gbaja-Biamila released his first book, Everyone Can Be a Ninja on May 7, 2019.

Early life
Gbaja-Biamila was born in Los Angeles, California to Nigerian immigrant parents. He is one of seven children.

He attended Crenshaw High School in South Los Angeles, where he was a star basketball player on teams which were part of the Willie West Jr. coaching era. He and his teammates won back-to-back City and State Championships in 1996 and 1997. Gbaja-Biamila moved to play football during his senior year. He was an all-league and all-conference choice. He was also named team’s defensive lineman of the year, compiling 11 sacks and 74 tackles in his senior campaign.

College career
In his senior year, Gbaja-Biamila received scholarship offers from University of Oregon, University of California, Berkeley, San Diego State, Fresno State, and Colorado State. He chose to go to San Diego State University, where his older brother also attended. Gbaja-Biamila was all-Mountain West Conference in 2002. He joined the group Athletes For Education, an outreach group that sent players to go into communities to work with young people on developing their life skills. He graduated with a degree in communication and new media studies, before completing a certified entrepreneurship program at the Wharton School of Business in 2005.

Professional career

Oakland Raiders
Gbaja-Biamila went undrafted in the 2003 NFL Draft and later signed with the Oakland Raiders as a free agent. He made the team out of training camp and played in 13 of the team's 16 regular season games. He recorded seven tackles (four solo) on the season, with his first and only sack of the season coming against Daunte Culpepper, then with the Minnesota Vikings.

In 2004, Gbaja-Biamila split time between defensive end and linebacker, occasionally filling in for players such as Travian Smith and Tyler Brayton. He appeared in 14 games for the Raiders during the regular season and was inactive for two games. He accumulated a career-high 14 tackles (11 solo) and added a sack on the year. That sack came against Brad Johnson and the Tampa Bay Buccaneers, while he recorded a season-high three tackles in games against the Denver Broncos and Jacksonville Jaguars. Gbaja-Biamila also recovered a blocked punt against the Carolina Panthers  which led to a Raiders touchdown.

Battling injuries during the 2005 training camp, Gbaja-Biamila was released by the Raiders on September 3. He had a workout with the Green Bay Packers two days later, but he was not signed and spent the season out of football.

San Diego Chargers
Gbaja-Biamila returned to the NFL in 2006 after being signed by the San Diego Chargers on January 12. The fit was a good one for him, who as slightly undersized yet quick defensive end was a perfect fit for the 3-4 defense employed by then-defensive coordinator Wade Phillips and the Chargers.

Miami Dolphins
On February 6, 2007, it was announced that Gbaja-Biamila had been signed to a future contract worth $7.4 million with the Miami Dolphins. The move reunited him with new Dolphins head coach Cam Cameron, who was offensive coordinator in San Diego the season before when Gbaja-Biamila was a member of the Chargers. On September 11, 2007, he was released by the Dolphins. He spent the season out of football.

Return to Oakland
Gbaja-Biamila briefly returned to the Raiders in 2008, but did not appear in a game and was released before the start of the season.

Other
In 2005, Gbaja-Biamila was selected as one of the NFL’s first athletes into their Broadcast Boot Camp, held in Mount Laurel, N.J., and designed to give 20 players a short and rigorous look into the skills needed to embark on a broadcast or journalism career after their playing careers. He also took advantage of some time between playing stints to volunteer at KSWB, the NBC affiliate in San Diego, and ended up as the co-host for Football Night in San Diego. He hosted the show for two and a half seasons (2006–2008) before getting one last shot in the NFL with the Miami Dolphins.

Television career

With his playing career over, Akbar turned his focus to the broadcast booth in addition to his philanthropic work, serving as an analyst for the Mtn. Network and CBS Sports Network for two years, while also taking voice and acting classes. He also founded Rush The Passer, a year-round athletic, academic and life skills program for youth in Southern California.

In 2010 he was approached by reality producer Mark Burnett to be part of a three-man athlete team for his latest project on ABC, Expedition Impossible. His team "The Football Players" finished in 4th place on the show. That role, and the exposure that came with it, helped further Akbar’s exposure.

, he has joined the NFL Network as a member of the NFL Fantasy Live cast of hosts. In 2013, he became a co-host alongside Matt Iseman for American Ninja Warrior being broadcast on G4, Esquire Network, and NBC. Akbar is also the co-host of Team Ninja Warrior alongside Iseman, a spin-off of American Ninja Warrior that debuted on Esquire Network in 2016, and American Ninja Warrior Junior with Iseman on Universal Kids in 2018. Akbar and Iseman provide their voices as themselves in American Ninja Warrior: Challenge.

On May 10, 2018, Gbaja-Biamila threw out the first pitch at Citizens Bank Park prior to a game between the San Francisco Giants and Philadelphia Phillies which was widely seen as being among the worst.

On September 2, 2021, it was announced that Akbar Gbaja-Biamila would join The Talk as a permanent co-host, and the second full-time male co-host on the show. Gbaja-Biamila appeared as a guest co-host on multiple episodes in June and July.

Personal life

Name meaning
Akbar’s full name is Akbar Olúwakẹ́mi Ìdòwú Gbàjà-Bíàmílà. Akbar is Arabic and means "greatest." His middle and last names are of the Yoruba language. The middle names, “Olúwakẹ́mi” means "God takes care of me" and “Ìdòwú” is a name given to a child born after twins. (One of his older brothers is Kabeer Gbaja-Biamila who was also a pro football player.) Their last name, Gbàjà-Bíàmílà, or Gbaja-Biamila means "One who, while fighting, pretends to be separating a fight."

Family
He is of Nigerian and Yoruba ancestry. Both of his parents were Muslim, until his mother converted to Christianity. While he was raised under a Sunni Muslim household,  he converted to Christianity while in college. In 2000, his father, Mustapha, was diagnosed with Parkinson's disease. In 2002, his mother, Bolatito, died in a car crash. While a member of the Chargers in 2006, Akbar routinely drove back and forth from San Diego to Los Angeles to spend time with his father. 

Akbar is married and has four children.

Charity
Gbaja-Biamila currently serves as a board member for the Asomugha Foundation, an organization aimed at creating better educational opportunities for impoverished communities. Akbar also serves on the board of the Michael J. Fox Foundation, which raises millions of dollars for Parkinson’s research.

References

External links 
 
 

1979 births
Living people
Players of American football from Los Angeles
Nigerian players of American football
American former Muslims
American people of Yoruba descent
American sportspeople of Nigerian descent
American football defensive ends
American football linebackers
Yoruba sportspeople
San Diego State Aztecs football players
Oakland Raiders players
Converts to Protestantism from Islam
San Diego Chargers players
Miami Dolphins players
College football announcers
National Football League announcers
Crenshaw High School alumni
Sportspeople from Los Angeles